Kot or KOT, may refer to:

 Eric Kot (born 1966), a Chinese actor
 Keepers of Tradition, an expansion of the trading card game Vampire: The Eternal Struggle
 Kot, a Polish surname
 Kot (lodging), student housing in Belgium
 Lagwan language, a Chadic language spoken in northern Cameroon and southwestern Chad

Places
Afghanistan
 Kot District, Nangarhar Province

Armenia
 Kot, an ancient settlement in modern-day Nerkin Getashen, Armenia

Hong Kong
 Kowloon Tong station, by MTR station code

India
 Kot, Agra, a village in Agra district Uttar Pradesh
 Kot, Fatehpur, Uttar Pradesh

Pakistan
 Kot (union council), an administrative unit in Malakand District, Khyber Pakhtunkhwa
 Kot Diji, an archaeological site on the Indus River
 Kot Lakhpat, Lahore, Punjab
 Kot Rajput, a town in Lahore District, Punjab
 Kot Sabzal, a town in Bahawalpur District, Punjab
 Kot, Swat, a hill station in northern Pakistan

Poland
 Kot, Warmian-Masurian Voivodeship

Slovenia
 Kot (valley), a valley in the Julian Alps, northwestern Slovenia
 Kot, Ig, a village in the Municipality of Ig, central Slovenia
 Kot, Lendava, a village in the Municipality of Lendava, northeastern Slovenia
 Kot na Pohorju, a village in the Municipality of Slovenska Bistrica, northeastern Slovenia
 Kot ob Kolpi, a village in the Municipality of Črnomelj, southeastern Slovenia
 Kot pri Damlju, a village in the Municipality of Črnomelj, southeastern Slovenia
 Kot pri Prevaljah, a village in the Municipality of Prevalje, northern Slovenia
 Kot pri Rakitnici, a village in the Municipality of Ribnica, southern Slovenia
 Kot pri Ribnici, a village in the Municipality of Ribnica, southern Slovenia
 Kot pri Veliki Slevici, a village in the Municipality of Velike Lašče, southeastern Slovenia
 Kot, Vodice, a former village in the Municipality of Vodice, central Slovenia